The 2001 United States Olympic Curling Trials were held from December 9 to 16, 2001 in Ogden, Utah. Through double round-robin tournaments the trials determined which men's and women's teams would represent the United States at the 2002 Winter Olympics, also in Ogden. Tim Somerville's team won the men's side; his third time at the Olympics, first time for third Mike Schneeberger, and second time for Myles Brundidge and John Gordon. Kari Erickson and her team of Debbie McCormick, Stacey Liapis, and Ann Swisshelm won the women's side, their only loss coming after they had already clinched the Olympics berth. This was the first Olympics for Erickson and her sister Liapis and second for McCormick and Swisshelm.

Qualification 
It was planned to have six men's teams and six women's teams compete at the Olympic Trials, with three methods of qualification: winning the 2000 or 2001 National Championships or through the National Olympic Qualifier events. Jason Larway's team won the  but was deemed ineligible because, as a Canadian living in the United States, teammate Greg Romaniuk was eligible for the National Championship but not for the Olympics. Therefore, five men's teams qualified from the National Olympic Qualifier instead of four, to fill out the field of six teams. The 32-team Men's National Olympic Qualifier took place March 28th to April 1st, 2001 at the Duluth Curling Club in Duluth, Minnesota. The five teams that qualified for the Trials were Paul Pustovar, Scott Baird, Andy Borland, Doug Pottinger, and Tim Somerville. Larway, with fellow curler Rich Ruohonen acting as his attorney, filed a grievance with the United States Olympic Committee and the United States Curling Association asking to be admitted to the Olympic Trials. Through an arbitration process Larway was eventually offered and accepted a seventh spot at the Olympic Trials. 

The Women's National Olympic Qualifier was held April 5 to 8, 2001 at the Utica Curling Club in Whitesboro, New York. Twenty teams competed, with Patti Lank, Lori Mountford, Cassie Johnson, and Nicole Joraanstad earning spots at the Olympic Trials as the top four teams. Margie Smith's team finished fifth and so was named an alternate qualifier, though ultimately was not needed.

Men

Teams
Seven men's teams qualified for the Olympic Trials:

Standings
The final standings after a double round-robin tournament:

Draw results
All draw times are listed in Mountain Time Zone (UTC−7).

Draw 1
Sunday, December 9, 2:00 pm

Draw 2 
Sunday, December 9, 7:00 PM

Draw 3 
Monday, December 10, 1:00 PM

Draw 4 
Monday, December 10, 7:00 PM

Draw 5 
Tuesday, December 11, 1:00 PM

Draw 6 
Tuesday, December 11, 7:00 PM

Draw 7 
Wednesday, December 12, 1:00 PM

Draw 8 
Wednesday, December 12, 7:00 PM

Draw 9 
Thursday, December 13, 1:00 PM

Draw 10 
Thursday, December 13, 7:00 PM

Draw 11 
Friday, December 14, 1:00 PM

Draw 12 
Friday, December 14, 7:00 PM

Draw 13 
Saturday, December 15, 1:00 PM

Draw 14 
Saturday, December 15, 7:00 PM

Tiebreaker 
Sunday, December 16, 9:00 AM

Women

Teams 
Six women's teams qualified for the Olympic Trials:

Standings
The final standings after a double round-robin tournament:

Draw results
All draw times are listed in Mountain Time Zone (UTC−7).

Draw 2 
Sunday, December 9, 7:00 PM

Draw 3 
Monday, December 10, 1:00 PM

Draw 4 
Monday, December 10, 7:00 PM

Draw 6 
Tuesday, December 11, 7:00 PM

Draw 7 
Wednesday, December 12, 1:00 PM

Draw 9 
Thursday, December 13, 1:00 PM

Draw 10 
Thursday, December 13, 7:00 PM

Draw 11 
Friday, December 14, 1:00 PM

Draw 12 
Friday, December 14, 7:00 PM

Draw 13 
Saturday, December 15, 1:00 PM

References

External links

United_States_Olympic_Curling_Trials
United States Olympic Curling Trials
United_States_Olympic_Curling_Trials
Curling at the 2002 Winter Olympics
Curling competitions in Utah
December 2001 sports events in the United States
Sports competitions in Ogden, Utah